The 1958–59 Liga Bet season saw Hapoel Tiberias and Hapoel Ramla promoted to Liga Alef as the respective winners of the north and south divisions. They were joined by runners-up, Hapoel Netanya and Hapoel Be'er Sheva, which were promoted after promotion play-offs.

No club relegated, as in the following season, Liga Bet expanded from 24 clubs, divided in two regional divisions, to 64 clubs, divided in four regional divisions.

North Division

South Division

Promotion play-offs
A promotion-relegation play-off between the 11th and 12th placed clubs in Liga Alef, Maccabi Sha'arayim and Hapoel Afula, and the second placed clubs of the regional divisions of Liga Bet, Hapoel Netanya and Hapoel Be'er Sheva. Each club played the other three once.

Shortly after the Relegation play-offs, as Hapoel Netanya appealed against the fielding of Hapoel Afula player Zvi Singel, and the three matches which were played by Hapoel Afula were given as a walkover win to the opposition, as the disciplinary tribunal determined that Singel was registered with Hapoel Beit HaShita and was not properly transferred to Hapoel Afula. Hapoel Afula appealed the decision, but the appeal was denied  and, as a result, Hapoel Afula were relegated to Liga Bet and Hapoel Netanya took their place in Liga Alef

References
Hapoel Rishon LeZion - Maccabi Shmuel 2:2, Hapoel Nahariya - Kfar Ata 1:0 (Page 6) Hadshot HaSport, 24.5.59, archive.football.co.il 
Maccabi Shmuel and Beitar Jaffa charged in matches interruption (Page 4) Hadshot HaSport, 28.5.59, archive.football.co.il 
Tiberias defeated (Page 6) Hadshot HaSport, 31.5.59, archive.football.co.il 
Hapoel Afula almost certain in Liga Alef Maariv, 7.6.59, Historical Jewish Press 
Hapoel Balfouria and Beer Sheva in Liga Alef Davar, 14.6.59, Historical Jewish Press 

Liga Bet seasons
Israel
3